Gleichenella is a genus of ferns in the family Gleicheniaceae with a single described species, Gleichenella pectinata.

References

Gleicheniales
Monotypic fern genera
Taxa named by Ren-Chang Ching